"Gangsta Nation" is a single by Westside Connection featuring Nate Dogg from their second album, Terrorist Threats, which was released in 2003. This was the only single from the album. Mike Epps makes a cameo appearance in the music video.

Track listing

Charts

Weekly charts

Year-end charts

References 

Westside Connection songs
2003 songs
Songs written by Ice Cube
Gangsta rap songs
Songs written by Mack 10
Songs written by WC (rapper)
Song recordings produced by Fredwreck